The 2011 Ankara bombing was a car bombing on September 20, 2011 that took place in Kizilay, Ankara, Turkey at 11:00 am. Three people were killed and 15 others were injured. One of the suspects was arrested on 1 May 2020. the suspect Ümit Akgümüş, was sentenced to 619 years and 6 months in prison, along with 6 aggravated life sentences.

References 

2011 bombing
2011 murders in Turkey
Car and truck bombings in Turkey
Improvised explosive device bombings in 2011
2011
2011 bombing
September 2011 crimes
September 2011 events in Turkey
Terrorist incidents in Turkey in 2011